Rickey Paulding (born October 23, 1982) is an American former professional basketball player. He played college basketball for the University of Missouri.

Early career
Paulding attended Renaissance High School in Detroit. In his senior season, he averaged 25.3 points per game, and 12 rebounds per game, and led his team to a 27-3 record. He was an honorable mention All-USA selection during that season as well.

College career
In his collegiate career, Paulding scored 1,200 points and grabbed 300 rebounds. Paulding scored 37 points and making an astounding nine threes against Dwyane Wade, Travis Diener and the Marquette Golden Eagles in the Tigers' loss in the second round of the NCAA tournament his junior year. He opted to return for his senior season.

Professional career
Paulding was drafted 54th overall in the second round of the 2004 NBA Draft by the Detroit Pistons. Paulding averaged 12.2 points per game in the NBA Summer League for the Pistons.

At the end of 2021–22 season, he has decided to retire from professional basketball.

Career statistics

Bundesliga
 
Regular Season

|-
| style="text-align:left;" | 2007–08
| style="text-align:left;" | Oldenburg
| 34 || 31 || 32.5 || .489 || .389 || .695 || 3.5 || 1.5 || 1.2 || 1.9 || 12.5 || 11.6
|-
| style="text-align:left;background:#AFE6BA;" | 2008–09
| style="text-align:left;" | Oldenburg
| 34 || 34 || 33.1 || .509 || .450 || .742 || 4.4 || 1.8 || 1.5 || 0.4 || 14.8 || 15.1
|-
| style="text-align:left;" | 2009–10
| style="text-align:left;" | Oldenburg
| 33 || 33 || 33.3 || .435 || .351 || .731 || 3.2 || 2.3 || 1.0 || 0.6 || 13.5 || 11.8
|-
| style="text-align:left;" | 2010–11
| style="text-align:left;" | Oldenburg
| 34 || 33 || style="background:#cfecec;"| 35.2 || .425 || .302 || .806 || 4.1 || 2.3 || 1.0 || 0.4 || 12.6  || 11.9
|-
| style="text-align:left;" | 2011–12
| style="text-align:left;" | Oldenburg
| 34 || 34 || 31.1 || .468 || .402 || .836 || 3.8 || 1.8 || 0.7 || 0.5 || 12.4 || 12.2
|-
| style="text-align:left;" | 2012–13
| style="text-align:left;" | Oldenburg
| 34 || 34 || 27.0 || .484 || .423 || .795 || 3.4 || 1.9 || 0.9 || 0.2 || 12.4 || 12.3
|-
| style="text-align:left;" | 2013–14
| style="text-align:left;" | Oldenburg
| 34 || 34 || 27.5 || .467 || .439 || .800 || 3.9 || 2.2 || 0.9 || 0.3 || 13.9 || 13.8
|-
| style="text-align:left;" | 2014–15
| style="text-align:left;" | Oldenburg
| 34 || 34 || 26.6 || .477 || .409 || .762 || 3.4 || 2.7 || 0.6 || 0.4 || 11.2 || 11.8
|-
| style="text-align:left;" | 2015–16
| style="text-align:left;" | Oldenburg
| 33 || 33 || 30.2 || .500 || .408 || .744 || 3.0 || 3.0 || 0.8 || 0.4 || 13.2 || 13.2
|-
| style="text-align:left;" | 2016–17
| style="text-align:left;" | Oldenburg
| 32 || 32 || 31.3 || .480|| .423 || .841 || 2.8 || 2.1 || 0.8 || 0.2 || 16.0 || 13.5
|-
| style="text-align:left;" | 2017–18
| style="text-align:left;" | Oldenburg
| 34 || 34 || 31.1 || .487 || .345 || .883 || 3.2 || 1.8 || 1.0 || 0.2 || 14.7 || 14.3
|-
| style="text-align:left;" | 2018–19
| style="text-align:left;" | Oldenburg
| 34 || 34 || 30.5 || .487 || .397 || .893 || 3.7 || 1.8 || 0.9 || 0.5 || 13.2 || 14.1
|-
| style="text-align:left;" | 2019–20
| style="text-align:left;" | Oldenburg
| 20 || 20 || 30.0 || .459 || .333 || .896 || 2.6 || 1.4 || 0.7 || 0.2 || 15.8 || 12.4
|-
| style="text-align:left;" | 2020–21
| style="text-align:left;" | Oldenburg
| 34 || 34 || 25.8 || .499 || .383 || .825 || 2.4 || 1.2 || 0.9 || 0.2 || 15.5 || 13.1
|-
| style="text-align:left;" | 2021–22
| style="text-align:left;" | Oldenburg
| 34 || 19 || 26.3 || .584 || .374 || .860 || 2.6 || 1.6 || 1.1 || 0.2 || 11.9 || 11.4
|- class="sortbottom"
| style="text-align:center;" colspan="2"| Career
| 492 || 473 || 30.3 || .480 || .390 || .805 || 3.4 || 2.0 || 0.9 || 0.3 || 13.5 || 12.8
|}

Playoffs

|-
| style="text-align:left;" | 2007–08
| style="text-align:left;" | Oldenburg
| 8 || 8 || 36.9 || .506 || .345 || .579 || 4.4 || 1.3 || 0.8 || 0.0 || 13.4 || 12.3
|-
| style="text-align:left;background:#AFE6BA;" | 2008–09
| style="text-align:left;" | Oldenburg
| 12 || 12 || 36.5 || .493 || .493 || .732 || 4.3 || 1.2 || 1.3 || 0.1 || 17.9 || 15.3
|-
| style="text-align:left;" | 2009–10
| style="text-align:left;" | Oldenburg
| 4 || 4 || 35.5 || .688 || .191 || .739 || 1.8 || 1.5 || 1.3 || 0.0 || 12.8 || 8.8
|-
| style="text-align:left;" | 2010–11
| style="text-align:left;" | Oldenburg
| 5 || 5 || 35.6 || .435 || .333 || .783 || 3.0 || 2.8 || 1.2 || 0.8 || 13.2 || 12.8
|-
| style="text-align:left;" | 2012–13
| style="text-align:left;" | Oldenburg
| 11 || 11 || 35.6 || .465 || .420 || .941 || 2.9 || 0.7 || 0.6 || 0.4 || 11.7 || 10.2
|-
| style="text-align:left;" | 2013–14
| style="text-align:left;" | Oldenburg
| 10 || 10 || 32.7 || .390 || .229 || .647 || 4.3 || 1.3 || 1.0 || 0.3 || 10.8 || 9.0
|-
| style="text-align:left;" | 2014–15
| style="text-align:left;" | Oldenburg
| 3 || 3 || 33.3 || .400 || .364 || .933 || 2.7 || 2.3 || 0.7 || 0.0 || 12.7 || 10.7
|-
| style="text-align:left;" | 2015–16
| style="text-align:left;" | Oldenburg
| 4 || 4 || 33.8 || .574 || .483 || .824 || 2.3 || 1.5 || 0.8 || 0.3 || 22.5 || 18.8
|-
| style="text-align:left;" | 2016–17
| style="text-align:left;" | Oldenburg
| 12 || 12 || 32.2 || .497 || .444 || .816 || 2.3 || 3.3 || 0.9 || 0.1 || 16.6 || 15.6
|-
| style="text-align:left;" | 2017–18
| style="text-align:left;" | Oldenburg
| 5 || 5 || 34.7 || .500 || .421 || .700 || 4.4 || 1.2 || 1.4 || 0.0 || 17.2 || 15.2
|-
| style="text-align:left;" | 2018–19
| style="text-align:left;" | Oldenburg
| 6 || 6 || 33.8 || .450 || .310 || .778 || 4.7 || 1.8 || 1.3 || 0.2 || 12.8 || 13.7
|-
| style="text-align:left;" | 2019–20
| style="text-align:left;" | Oldenburg
| 8 || 8 || 26.7 || .361 || .273 || .783 || 2.1 || 1.9 || 0.1 || 0.4 || 10.9 || 7.1
|-
| style="text-align:left;" | 2020–21
| style="text-align:left;" | Oldenburg
| 4 || 4 || 29.0 || .418 || .261 || .813 || 2.5 || 2.0 || 0.8 || 0.3 || 16.3 || 12.8
|}

BBL-Pokal

|-
| style="text-align:left;background:#AFE6BA;" | 2015
| style="text-align:left;" | Oldenburg
| 2 || 2 || 29.3 || .471 || .406 || .807 || 3.4 || 2.7 || 0.6 || 0.4 || 7.0 || 11.7
|-
| style="text-align:left;" | 2016
| style="text-align:left;" | Oldenburg
| 1 || 1 || 30.0 || .500 || .000 || 1.000 || 4.0 || 2.9 || 0.8 || 0.4 || 14.2 || 13.8
|-
| style="text-align:left;" | 2019
| style="text-align:left;" | Oldenburg
| 1 || 1 || 32.7 || .636 || .667 || .000 || 5.0 || 1.0 || 1.0 || 0.4 || 18.0 || 14.0
|-
| style="text-align:left;" | 2020
| style="text-align:left;" | Oldenburg
| 4 || 4 || 30.8 || .429 || .571 || .867 || 3.5 || 2.3 || 0.3 || 0.0 || 13.5 || 12.0
|-
| style="text-align:left;" | 2021
| style="text-align:left;" | Oldenburg
| 2 || 2 || 24.6 || .417 || .364 || .000 || 2.5 || 2.0 || 0.0 || 1.0 || 12.0 || 8.5
|-
| style="text-align:left;" | 2022
| style="text-align:left;" | Oldenburg
| 1|| 1 || 32.2 || .380 || .500 || 1.000 || 3.0 || 1.0 || 0.0 || 1.0 || 10.0 || 10.0
|}

Awards and honors
2003 Wooden Award pre-season finalist
2003 Second Team All Big 12
Scored 36 points in the NCAA Tournament against Marquette.
Made 9 three-point field goals against Marquette
7th Highest all time scorer at Mizzou.
Most points ever scored on former NBA player Dwyane Wade in a single NCAA game.
Starter for the Northern All-Star Team in the Basketball Bundesliga All-Star Games 2009-2011.
2009 BBL Finals MVP after leading EWE Baskets Oldenburg to the league title.
Most Likeable Player of the 2008/2009 Basketball Bundesliga Season

References

External links
Missouri Tigers bio

1982 births
Living people
20th-century African-American people
21st-century African-American sportspeople
African-American basketball players
American expatriate basketball people in France
American expatriate basketball people in Germany
American expatriate basketball people in Israel
American men's basketball players
ASVEL Basket players
Basketball players at the 2003 Pan American Games
Basketball players from Detroit
BCM Gravelines players
Detroit Pistons draft picks
Detroit Pistons players
EWE Baskets Oldenburg players
Hapoel Jerusalem B.C. players
Israeli Basketball Premier League players
Missouri Tigers men's basketball players
Pan American Games competitors for the United States
Parade High School All-Americans (boys' basketball)
Renaissance High School alumni
Riesen Ludwigsburg players
Shooting guards
Small forwards
S.Oliver Würzburg players